Mavanda (also Romanized as Māvāndā) is a village in Alan Rural District, in the Central District of Sardasht County, West Azerbaijan Province, Iran. At the 2006 census, its population was 38, in 7 families.

References 

Populated places in Sardasht County